Metacarcinus is a genus of crabs formerly included in the genus Cancer. It includes nine exclusively fossil species and five extant species, of which four are also known from the fossil record. A molecular study using the cytochrome oxidase I gene does not support the monophyly of this genus.

Description
Metacarcinus crabs have an oval carapace of about ⅔ of its largest width, with a surface with poorly marked division of smooth or gently colored regions. The front edge usually does not protrude before orbital, and the total length of these edges is 26–34% of the largest width of the carapace, with  5 spikes, including inner orbits, of which the middle springs lower than the others. 9–10 spikes are located on both anteroposterior lateral sides of the carapace; they can be of different shapes. The lateral edges are edged and can have one spike. The claws propodite is characterized by an upper edge at an angle of about 120° to the distal edge, equipped with sharp spines or grained or smooth keel. On the external surface of the propodite there are usually 4 balls. The cutting edges of the pliers' fingers of the claw have sharp teeth. The fixed finger has two points: middle and on the bottom edge.

Extant species
Included species:

Fossils
† Metacarcinus danai (Miocene, California)
† Metacarcinus davidi (Miocene to Pliocene, California)
† Metacarcinus goederti (Oligocene, Alaska)
† Metacarcinus izumoensis (Miocene, Japan) 
† Metacarcinus jenniferae (Middle Pliocene, California)
† Metacarcinus minutoserratus (Pliocene, Japan)
† Metacarcinus starri (Early Oligocene, Washington)

References

External links

Cancroidea
Decapod genera
Extant Oligocene first appearances
Taxa named by Alphonse Milne-Edwards